Purificación Ortiz (Campo de Criptana, 1972) is a paralympic athlete from Spain competing mainly in category F11 (totally blind) long jump and sprint events.

Biography
Purificación competed in three Paralympic games, first in 1988 then in 1992 in her home country and finally 1996. At her first games she finished fifth in the B1 long jump. She followed this up in 1992 with a new world record on the way to winning gold in the long jump, she also finished second behind compatriot Purificación Santamarta who twice broke the world record in the 100m and finished third in the 200m in a race again won by her compatriot Purificacion Santamarta in a world record time.  In 1996 she was entered in the 100m but didn't run but did compete in the long jumpfinishing third behind her fellow Spaniards Magdalena Amo and Rosalía Lázaro who both jumped a new Paralympic record.

References

Paralympic athletes of Spain
Athletes (track and field) at the 1988 Summer Paralympics
Athletes (track and field) at the 1992 Summer Paralympics
Athletes (track and field) at the 1996 Summer Paralympics
Paralympic gold medalists for Spain
Paralympic silver medalists for Spain
Paralympic bronze medalists for Spain
Living people
World record holders in Paralympic athletics
Medalists at the 1992 Summer Paralympics
Medalists at the 1996 Summer Paralympics
Year of birth missing (living people)
Paralympic medalists in athletics (track and field)
Spanish female sprinters
Spanish female long jumpers
Visually impaired sprinters
Visually impaired long jumpers
Paralympic sprinters
Paralympic long jumpers